Johannishus Castle is a castlelike manor house in Ronneby Municipality, Blekinge County, Sweden. The town of Johannishus is located a few kilometers south of the estate.

History
The manor was founded around 1670-1680 by  Hans Wachtmeister (1641-1714),  Admiral general of the Swedish Royal Navy.  
The main building  was completed in 1779 under the ownership of Count Fredrik Georg Hans Carl Wachtmeister (1720–1792). It was designed by architect Carl Fredric Adelcrantz (1716-1796). 
The estate in now managed by Johannishus Gods which conducts forestry, agriculture and game management on the property.

See also
List of castles in Sweden

References

External links
Johannishus Gods  website
Buildings and structures  in Blekinge County
Manor houses in Sweden